Hans-Jürgen Bargfrede (born 10 March 1959) is a German former professional footballer and coach. Bargfrede made 111 appearances as a midfielder for St. Pauli FC between 1981 and 1989 and later became a football coach at TuS Heeslingen.

Personal life
He has three sons who are called Jennings, Bent and Philipp. Philipp is also a professional footballer and has played for Werder Bremen.

References

1959 births
Living people
Association football midfielders
German footballers
Bundesliga players
2. Bundesliga players
SV Werder Bremen players
SV Werder Bremen II players
FC St. Pauli players
SC Preußen Münster players
German football managers